Tiago de Albergaria Pinheiro Goulart de Bettencourt (born 16 September 1979) is a Portuguese singer-songwriter.

Personal life 
Tiago Bettencourt was born in Coimbra and later moved to Lisbon. His father was born in São Jorge Island, Azores; his mother is from Coimbra. Together with his brother, João, he attended the Colégio D. Luísa Sigea in Estoril. His mother was a teacher of Portuguese at the Salesian School in Estoril. Later on he attended Liceu S. João and got a degree in architecture from Universidade Lusiada.

Toranja 

Bettencourt was the lead singer of the band Toranja. In 2003, they released their debut album Esquissos, which sold over 60,000 copies. However, the band announced an indefinite hiatus in 2006.

Tiago Bettencourt – Solo career 
After Toranja, Bettencourt left Portugal for Canada to record his first solo album in the Hotel2Tango studios in Montreal, the same studio that produced the successful album Funeral by Arcade Fire. The producer was Howard Bilerman. Here, he already worked together with his backing band, Mantha, composed of Pedro Gonçalves and João Lencastre. The result of the recording sessions was released as O Jardim ('The Garden' in Portuguese) in 2007. The song Canção Simples (Simple Song) was a major hit. Their second album, Em Fuga, was released in 2010, and followed by Tiago Na Toca & Os Poetas in 2011 and Acústico in 2012. The latter album contained 'unplugged' versions of earlier songs, performed together with guests including Concerto Moderno, Lura, and Jorge Palma.

In 2014 his album Do Principio was released, consisting of 12 songs including "Aquilo Que Eu Não Fiz", a song with a strong political message although Tiago said in an interview that it was based only on a childhood experience.

In 2020 he released 2019 Rumo ao Eclipse where he states that it talks about choices, struggles, hurt and indignation, detachment, relief, acceptance, home, and freedom. Trégua, Dança, Imaginei, Viagem and Não Queiras Mais de Mim were the singles that showcased the album.

Other appearances 
Bettencourt had a stint on the Portuguese television station TVI Canta Por Mim (Sing For Me) as a celebrity where he sang alongside Dalila Carmo. Both were together until the final, where he qualified in second position.

Discography 

 O Jardim (2007)
 Em Fuga (2010)
 Tiago Na Toca & Os Poetas (2011)
 Acústico (2012)
 Do Princípio (2014)
 A Procura (2017)
 2019 Rumo ao Eclipse (2020)

Ancestry

Patrilineal descent

Tiago's patriline is the line from which he is descended father to son.

 Jorge Oliveira de Lemos, 1707–
 Manuel Silveira de Oliveira, 1728–
 José da Silveira, 1779–
 António da Silveira, 1810–1875
 Manuel Inácio da Silveira Bettencourt, 1838–1924
 João Euthymio de Bettencourt, 1878–1948
 João Goulart de Bettencourt, 1914–1987
 João Amândio Teixeira Goulart de Bettencourt, b. 1945
 Tiago de Albergaria Pinheiro Goulart de Bettencourt, b. 1979

References

1979 births
Living people
Tiago
People from Coimbra
21st-century Portuguese male singers
Portuguese male singer-songwriters